The Fox Cities of Northeastern Wisconsin are the cities, towns and villages along the Fox River as it flows from Lake Winnebago northward into Green Bay.

The Fox Cities communities, as defined by its Chamber of Commerce and Convention and Visitors Bureau, include:

 Calumet County
 Outagamie County
 Winnebago County

 The cities of Appleton (pop. 74,526), Kaukauna (16,246), Menasha (18,268), Neenah (26,062), and Oshkosh (67,004).
 The villages of Combined Locks (pop. 3,588), Fox Crossing (19,029), Harrison (11,532), Hortonville (2,767), Kimberly (6,803), Little Chute (11,564), Sherwood (2,985), and Greenville (10,309)
 The towns of Buchanan (pop. 6,755), Clayton (3,951), Freedom (5,842), Grand Chute (20,919), Greenville, Kaukauna (1,238), Neenah (3,237), Vandenbroek (1,474).

Major points of interest include the Fox Cities Exhibition Center, Community First Champion Center, Fox Cities Performing Arts Center, High Cliff State Park, and Neuroscience Group Field at Fox Cities Stadium. The Fox River Mall is the largest shopping mall in the state at 1.2 million square feet.

Area post-secondary schools include Fox Valley Technical College, Lawrence University, and the University of Wisconsin-Oshkosh, Fox Cities Campus.

Bus transit for the area is provided by Valley Transit and commercial airline service is provided by Appleton International Airport.

Major highway routes in the area include: Interstate 41/U.S. Route 41, which connects the Fox Cities with Green Bay and Milwaukee; Wisconsin Highway 441, known locally as the Tri-County Expressway, which is an auxiliary highway of Interstate 41 that serves as a beltway around Appleton; and U.S. Route 10 which travels east-west, connecting the Fox Cities with Stevens Point, Waupaca and Manitowoc, along with Interstate 39 and Wausau. 

Television and radio stations in the area, usually originating out of Green Bay, utilize the term "Green Bay/Fox Cities" in their station identifications to encompass both major population centers in the region.

Combined Statistical Area
The Fox Cities constitute a portion of the Appleton-Oshkosh-Neenah, WI Combined Statistical Area (CSA), which also includes the City of Oshkosh and rural portions of Calumet, Outagamie and Winnebago Counties. As of the 2010 Census, the CSA had a population of 392,660 (2017 estimate: 406,540), making it the third largest CSA in Wisconsin, behind Milwaukee and Madison.

At night

References

External links
 Fox Cities Chamber of Commerce
 Fox Cities Convention and Visitors Bureau
 Fox Cities Regional Partnership

 Metropolitan areas of Wisconsin